Daniel Armand may refer to:

Daniel Armand (The 4400), fictional character
Daniel Armand, mayor of Anisy
Daniel Armand (footballer) for AS Béziers Hérault (football)

See also
Daniel Armand-Delille (1906–1957), French bobsledder